Midnights is the tenth studio album by American singer-songwriter Taylor Swift, released on October 21, 2022, via Republic Records. It was announced at the 2022 MTV Video Music Awards, marking Swift's first new body of work since her 2020 alternative folk albums, Folklore and Evermore. A concept album about nocturnal ruminations, Midnights was written and produced by Swift with longtime collaborator Jack Antonoff.

Inspired by Swift's "sleepless nights", Midnights contains confessional yet cryptic lyrics, exploring anxiety, insecurity, self-criticism, self-awareness, insomnia, and self-confidence. Expanding on the synth-pop sound of Swift's previous pop projects, the album experiments with electronica, dream pop, bedroom pop, and chill-out music styles. The songs are characterized by subtle grooves, vintage synthesizers, drum machine, and hip hop/R&B rhythms. Swift unveiled the standard track list on a TikTok series called Midnights Mayhem with Me from September 21 to October 7, 2022, and surprise-released seven bonus tracks.

Midnights received critical acclaim for its restrained production, candid songwriting and vocal cadences. Critics dubbed the album a career concoction, incorporating references to and elements from Swift's previous albums, and placed it in best-albums rankings of 2022. It was commercially successful across all formats of music consumption and broke a string of records globally; publications dubbed the ubiquitous success a testament to Swift's cultural impact and longevity. It achieved the Spotify feat for the most single-day streams of an album and topped the charts in 28 territories. In the United States, it opened with over 1.5 million units, logged Swift's 11th number-one on the Billboard 200, the largest vinyl sales week of the 21st century, and became the best-selling album of 2022.

The album spawned 10 top-ten songs on the Billboard Hot 100—the most for any album—in the same week. The lead single "Anti-Hero" scored Swift her ninth number-one song in the US and topped the charts in 14 other territories; fellow tracks such as "Lavender Haze", "Maroon", "Snow on the Beach" featuring Lana Del Rey, "Midnight Rain", and "Bejeweled" also achieved high positions internationally. To support Midnights along with her other albums, Swift has embarked on the Eras Tour in 2023; an overwhelming demand for the tickets crashed its Ticketmaster pre-sale.

Background 
After a dispute over the sale of the masters of her first six studio albums in 2019, Taylor Swift announced that she plans to re-record the said albums. She released the first two of these re-recordings, Fearless (Taylor's Version) and Red (Taylor's Version), in 2021. The latter included the ten-minute, original version of her 2012 song "All Too Well". It was accompanied by a corresponding short film, All Too Well: The Short Film, written and directed by Swift. Many speculated that her next album would be the re-recording of Speak Now (2010) or 1989 (2014).

Swift garnered five nominations for the short film at the 2022 MTV Video Music Awards on August 28, 2022, and won three of them. In her acceptance speech for the Video of the Year award, she announced a "brand-new" studio album scheduled for release on October 21, 2022. Shortly after, Swift's official website was updated with a clock counting down to midnight and the phrase "Meet me at midnight". The canvases of some of Swift's songs on Spotify were changed to a visual featuring the clock. At midnight, Swift posted across her social media accounts that her tenth studio album would be titled Midnights, accompanied by a premise. She described the album as "the stories of 13 sleepless nights scattered throughout [her] life". Swift's official website crashed due to heavy traffic following the posts.

Writing and production 

According to Swift, the subject matter of Midnights was inspired by five major topics: self-hatred, revenge fantasies, "wondering what might have been", falling in love, and "falling apart". Swift enlisted Jack Antonoff, her longtime collaborator since 2013, to co-produce Midnights with her, which came together as a result of Swift's and Antonoff's partners, English actor Joe Alwyn and American actress Margaret Qualley, respectively, shooting in Panama for the 2022 romantic thriller film Stars at Noon. While their partners were filming, Swift and Antonoff worked together in New York City. The duo wrote 11 of the album's 13 songs together; of the remaining two, Swift wrote the track "Vigilante Shit" alone and "Sweet Nothing" with Alwyn, who is credited with his pseudonym William Bowery. Some bonus tracks were co-produced by Aaron Dessner, who had collaborated with Swift on her 2020 albums Folklore and Evermore. She conceived the bonus tracks on their "journey to find that magic 13 [tracks]", and claimed that she released them because she wanted to share her entire creative process with fans.

Swift's love life inspired the lyrics of "Lavender Haze" and "Snow on the Beach", the former of which takes after the phrase "in the lavender haze" from the period drama series Mad Men. Swift wrote "Lavender Haze" after she and Alwyn had to protect their relationship from unsolicited scrutiny online ("weird rumors" and "tabloid stuff"). "Snow on the Beach" is about "falling in love with someone at the same time as they’re falling in love with you", and is co-written by American singer Lana Del Rey. The composition of "Lavender Haze" was first conceived by Antonoff when he heard Sounwave, one of his collaborators, press a button accidentally, playing a "small little loop" produced by Jahaan Sweet. Sounwave edited the loop, adding "a bunch of effects". Sam Dew wrote some melodies to the loop with Zoë Kravitz, who had been working with Antonoff as well. Antonoff then pitched the song to Swift, who wrote its lyrics. "Glitch" was also born from these sessions. Sweet further reached out to Swift via Antonoff with "Karma", which had also been worked on by Keanu Beats. The next day, Antonoff returned with "Karma" finished with Swift's vocals on it. In "Anti-Hero", Swift detailed her insecurities, such as struggling with "not feeling like a person".

Music and lyrics 
The standard edition of Midnights consists of thirteen tracks. The deluxe CD adds three bonus songs, of which two are remixes, while Midnights (3am Edition), available only on music streaming platforms, adds seven other bonus tracks. Six of the album's tracks are labelled explicit. Del Rey provides guest vocals on the fourth track, "Snow on the Beach".

Composition 
Midnights has been described as an electronica, dream pop, synth-pop, bedroom pop, electropop, and chill-out music album, with R&B influences and ambient elements. Swift departed from the alternative folk sound of Folklore and Evermore to create an experimental album with an "alt-synth" soundscape. "Maximalist minimalism" is the sonic signature of Midnights, incorporating subtle melodies, emphasized rhythms, vintage synthesizers (prominently Moog and Roland Juno-60), drum machine, Reese bass, Mellotron, downbeats, and low-key harmonies. Swift's vocals retain a country timbre, but with rhythmic and conversational cadences. The vocals are sometimes electronically manipulated, resulting in androgynous and "hiccuping" vocal effects. Influences of hip hop and rapping are present in Swift's vocal delivery as well, in line with the lyrics' internal rhymes. In describing its overall sound, Paste said Midnights "moves fairly effortlessly between the discotheque and a moonlit boulevard". Beats Per Minute regarded the album as Swift's foray into alternative R&B.

Theme 

Midnights is a concept album, about "after-hour agonies" and thoughts. Midnight is a recurring lyrical motif in Swift's music, having been used in different contexts and viewpoints in her preceding albums. The A.V. Club said Midnights expands the artistic motif "into a full-blown album". The album marks Swift's return to a mostly autobiographical lyricism, after exploring fictitious storylines and characters in Folklore and Evermore. The New Yorker said Midnights is a collage of various emotions during "the spontaneous, restless headspace of nighttime thought". The main themes are self-assurance, self-criticism, insecurity, anxiety, public image, and insomnia, with a characteristic confessional but "cryptic" tone. Several critics regard Midnights as Swift's most candid, confident, and frankest writing yet, and a consolidatory work of her career, containing "bits and pieces from all of Swift's eras". The New York Times said Midnights is "caught between yesterday and tomorrow".

Songs 

The opening track, "Lavender Haze", is a disco-inflected, rhythmic pop song driven by a murky groove, falsetto chorus, modular synths, and backing vocals from Kravitz. It is an R&B-leaning, "emo-erotic" track about the tabloid scrutiny and online rumors that Swift and Alwyn face, and references the Madonna–whore complex. "Maroon" is a dynamic dream pop song with a buzzing drone. It is about a "missed-chance romance", recalling several specific memories. The title is a call-back to Swift's fourth studio album, Red (2012), with the maroon color serving as the more "experienced version" of red. "Anti-Hero" is a pop rock song about self-loathing. "Snow on the Beach" is a hazy dream pop ballad, featuring backing vocals by Del Rey. It references "All for You" (2001) by Janet Jackson.

The fifth track, "You're on Your Own, Kid", is an alternative rock song that begins with muted instrumentals and swells into a crescendo. It discusses Swift's early stardom and her struggles during rise to fame, such as her eating disorder. "Midnight Rain", sees Swift remember an old relationship that was forestalled by her professional ambition and ambivalence about settling down. It features a pitched-down hook, programmed drums and percussion. "Question...?", asks rhetorical questions about "blurry" memories. Its short intro interpolates Swift's own 2016 single "Out of the Woods". "Vigilante Shit" is built around bubbling beats, swirling synths, industrial elements, and snare drums. It is a "noirish" vengeance declaration, taking aim at an enemy and encourages other women to do the same. "Bejeweled" is a disco tune driven by synth arpeggios, with lyrics recognizing Swift's self-worth.

The tenth track, "Labyrinth", is a steady synth-pop song with skittering electronic elements, church organ, and subtle guitars, about the anxiety over falling in love again. "Karma" is a playful, electroclash and chillwave "diss track" with elements of new wave, alternative pop and techno, and comical lyrics. It describes the culmination of Swift's "good karma". Employing a double entendre, "Sweet Nothing" is a relaxed, love song driven by saxophone and electric piano, emulating 1970s ballads. It is an ode to Swift's calm romantic relationship inside her house, as opposed to her hectic stardom outside. The standard album closes with "Mastermind", which satirizes Swift's alternate perspective on fate and happenstance. She confesses that her "calculating approach to pop stardom seeped into her love life as well", as opposed to her views about spontaneity of destiny in the Folklore track, "Invisible String". It is also a nod to Swift's own "cryptic and Machiavellian" habit of leaving Easter eggs.

The first bonus track, "The Great War", evokes battle imagery to show the easiness two people in a relationship can find themselves in a conflict, while also paying tribute to a partner who puts a stop to one's own destructive tendencies. In the ballad "Bigger Than the Whole Sky", Swift sings about the grief after the loss of a loved one; it was compared to "Ronan", which was written about the death of a young boy to cancer days before his fourth birthday. "Paris" is an upbeat, synth-heavy pop track, reminiscent of her style in 1989. "High Infidelity" employs audio distortions as a metaphor for a bad connection in a relationship between musicians. "Glitch" is an electronica song, about "malfunctioning" from lust. It features octave shifts in the chorus. In "Would've, Could've, Should've", Swift expresses regret over entering into a relationship with a "grown" man when she was 19, his treatment of her, and the persisting emotional trauma. "Dear Reader" is an electro-pop tune about Swift's concern over her listeners regarding her music as the "guiding light". In the deluxe track "Hits Different", Swift pictures her former partner with someone else, while reflecting on their own time together.

Art direction 
Upon the album's announcement, press outlets speculated that Swift's Moschino outfit for the VMAs afterparty—a navy blue micro mini romper embellished with silver stars—teased the album's aesthetic. Analyzing the album's promotional pictures, The Ringer described the aesthetic as "glam, but a chill, interior kind of glamor as opposed to big popstar glamor", with midnight blue dominating the color palette and retro photographs featuring upholstery. Clock faces and "60s/'70s family-room decor" are also a part of the Midnights era. Vogue noted 1970s styles in Swift's fashion, marking a departure from the rural, cottagecore attire she had adopted for Folklore and Evermore. Fashion critic Jess Cartner-Morley found it reminiscent of the album cover of Country Life (1974) by English art rock band Roxy Music and the photographs by French artist Guy Bourdin for Vogue France.

Cover artwork 
The standard cover artwork of Midnights is minimalist. It takes inspiration from old-fashioned LP jackets whose songs were listed on the front cover. The photograph of Swift featured in the artwork depicts her in blue eye shadow, black eye liner, and her signature red lips, observing a glimmering lighter held near her face. It depicts trāṭaka according to Beats Per Minute. The typeface used is Neue Haas Grotesk. The album title and track listing are in a blue gradient. The vinyl edition of the cover, posted by Swift across her social media, splits the track list into an A-side and B-side, indicating a two-sided LP. Three limited-edition color variants of the physical album, featuring different cover artworks were also issued. The Cut said the covers depict Swift in "various states of glamorous late-night stress." The Dallas Observer noted similarities to the indie sleaze aesthetic. Additionally, the reverse side of the standard and three alternate editions each portray a quarter sector of a dial; when assembled together and combined with a clock mechanism sold separately, they form a functioning clock.

Release and promotion 
Midnights was released at midnight EDT on October 21, 2022. It marked Swift's fifth album release in the three-year span of 2020–2022, whereas she had released only four albums in the entire 2010s decade preceding that; commenting on the recent "rapid pace" of her album cycles, Swift stated that she feels to create music "more freely" than she did during her 20s, and that she is "happier when [she] is making things more often." Swift engaged in a traditional roll-out for Midnights, following limited promotion of her surprise-released albums during the COVID-19 pandemic. On the Midnights Manifest, an itinerary for the album release, Swift teased a "very chaotic surprise" occurring hours after the release, which was eventually revealed to be the extended album, entitled Midnights (3am Edition), containing seven bonus tracks that Swift said were written for the album but ultimately excluded from the standard thirteen; and was released at 03:00 EDT. Midnights was available in five CD, vinyl LP and digital album editions each, as well as a cassette.

Marketing 

To "defy" her usual routine of incorporating Easter eggs to hint at information, Swift released a video series on TikTok called Midnights Mayhem with Me, consisting of thirteen episodes between September 21 and October 7, 2022. She unveiled the track-list in a randomized order in the series, one song per episode, in front of a curtain backdrop, accompanied by an elevator music tune. A lottery cage containing 13 ping pong balls numbered from one to thirteen, each representing a track of the album, was rolled, and when a ball drops out, Swift disclosed the title of the corresponding track on the album, through a telephone. The first episode revealed the thirteenth track "Mastermind", and the final episode revealed "Snow on the Beach" and its Del Rey feature.

Some lyrics from Midnights were displayed on Spotify's billboards across the world in the days leading up to the album's launch, starting with Times Square on October 17. Swift also posted an itinerary, entitled Midnights Manifest, detailing the promotional events scheduled for the album. She limited her press appearances and did not perform, only appearing on The Tonight Show Starring Jimmy Fallon on October 24, and The Graham Norton Show on October 28. An iHeartRadio program called Midnights with Taylor, featuring commentary from Swift, ran on its pop stations from October 21 to 26, during which the album received airplay. She also answered some fan-submitted questions for Sirius XM Hits 1.

Visuals 
Three music videos—for "Anti-Hero", "Bejeweled", and "Lavender Haze"—were released on October 21 and 25, and January 27, 2023, respectively. The teaser trailer for the album's music videos exclusively premiered during Amazon Prime Video's Thursday Night Football broadcast on October 20, 2022, with a pre-taped introduction by Swift, which was first announced by American sportscaster Charissa Thompson on October 14 as "something very, very special". It revealed a trailer compiling clips of several visual works based on Midnights. The cast includes Swift, Jack Antonoff, Laura Dern, the Haim sisters, Mike Birbiglia, Laith Ashley, Dita Von Teese, Mary Elizabeth Ellis, John Early, and Pat McGrath, with cinematography by Rina Yang, who previously worked with Swift on All Too Well: The Short Film. Swift wrote and directed the music videos. The music video for the lead single, "Anti-Hero", premiered eight hours after the release of Midnights. She described it as a depiction of her "nightmare scenarios and intrusive thoughts." Besides "Anti-Hero", the Midnights Manifest itinerary specified a music video release for "another track", which Swift later confirmed to be "Bejeweled", which was an alternate take on the Cinderella plot., The "Lavender Haze" music video—described by Swift as a "sultry sleepless 70's fever dream"—explores psychedelic and surrealist symbolisms, featuring Laith Ashley.

Media response 
Pitchfork, Time, and the Recording Academy named Midnights as one of the most anticipated records of fall 2022; USA Today called it the most anticipated release of Swift's career. Time found the 13-song track list a "concise lineup" for Swift, whose last album, Red (Taylor's Version), consisted of 30 tracks. The New York Times called Swift a "restless creative force" for releasing her fifth album in three years and expected Midnights to become one of 2022's best-selling albums, despite its October release, with Quartz projecting Midnights to achieve record-setting vinyl sales. Los Angeles Times compared Swift's "prolific run of albums" to those of "the all-time greats".

The lack of a pre-released single led to speculation over the album's sound on the internet. Variety opined Midnights could either "continue in that more subdued, acoustic, Americana vein" of Folklore and Evermore, or return to the "pure pop" of Lover (2019) and its immediate predecessors. ABC News described the album's release as a "dramatic" event. Several publications, such as The Washington Post, praised Swift's marketing strategy. Fortune and El País commended the promotional roll-out for its "aura of mystery and excitement" and the "art of suspense". Slate and I-D opined that Midnights is "the result of a winning formula"—hybridizing the modern "surprise-drop approach", which is more streaming-friendly but unfavorable for physical sales, with the traditional, "old-school" rollout by preannouncing the album, but nevertheless withholding all of the songs until the release day, which cements the album release as a "proper newsworthy event".

Singles 
"Anti-Hero" is the lead single of Midnights. Republic Records released the song to the US hot adult contemporary radio on October 24, 2022, followed by contemporary hit radio on October 25. It became the best-selling song of 2022. "Bejeweled" and "Question...?" were released for limited-time digital download exclusively through Swift's website on October 25, as promotional singles. "Lavender Haze" was released to American contemporary hit radio as the second single on November 29.

Tour 

On November 1, 2022, Swift revealed on Good Morning America and social media her sixth concert tour, the Eras Tour. She described the tour as "a journey through the musical eras of [her] career". The dates for the US leg have been revealed, while international dates are pending. The Eras Tour recorded an incredibly high demand for tickets, so much so that Swift added additional dates to the US portion of the tour. On November 15, the tickets went up for sale on Ticketmaster's website, which crashed immediately, halting the presale. The public on-sale was later canceled due to "insufficient" inventory to meet the demand. Nevertheless, the Eras Tour sold over two million tickets on its first day of presale alone, breaking the all-time record for the most concert tickets sold by an artist in a single day. However, Ticketmaster was widely criticized by fans, customers, consumer groups and US lawmakers for a flawed and deceitful ticketing service. Two lawsuits were filed by fans on Ticketmaster for "intentional deception", fraud, price fixing and antitrust violations, in December 2022. Billboard reported that the Eras Tour has already grossed an estimated $554 million, surpassing Madonna's Sticky & Sweet Tour (2008–09) to become the highest-grossing tour by a female artist of all time.

Critical reception 

Midnights received widespread acclaim from music critics, most of whom praised its subdued production and vocals; some named it Swift's best album yet. On Metacritic, which assigns a normalized score out of 100 to ratings from publications, the album received a weighted mean score of 85 based on 28 reviews, indicating "universal acclaim". Aggregator AnyDecentMusic? gave it 8.0 out of 10, based on their assessment of the critical consensus.

Rolling Stones Brittany Spanos and Rob Sheffield, and Alex Bilmes of Esquire dubbed Midnights an instant classic; Spanos praised Swift's "brilliant and fresh" songwriting style, Sheffield highlighted the moody production, and Blimes called it "the pop album of the year". Reviews published by Billboard Jason Lipshutz, Variety Chris Willman, Clash's Matthew Neale, Under the Radar Andy Von Pip, and The Guardian Alexis Petridis all appreciated Midnights for favoring an elegant and understated production over the market-oriented chart hits of Swift's contemporaries. Alex Hopper in American Songwriter said the album is a "grungier" 1989 with the lyrical proficiency of Folklore and Evermore. PopMatters Rick Quinn stated that Swift "demonstrates her mastery of pop structure and style" in Midnights. In Paste, Ellen Johnson considered the album more nuanced than mainstream pop, while containing some of Swift's "sleekest pop tunes yet". The Associated Press' Elise Ryan felt the album is a product of Swift's maturity and artistic evolution, while Gigwise's Lucy Harbron praised the reinvention and experimentation.

Reviews also noticed a more refined aspect to Swift's songwriting approach in Midnights. According to NME Hannah Mylrea, the "candid" lyrics depart from the narrative-driven songwriting Swift had been known for and offer a glimpse into her expanding artistry. Mikael Wood of the Los Angeles Times admired Swift's strong vocals and wrote that while much of Midnights relies on her well-known first-person songwriting, it is "so strong [...] that eventually you stop caring what's drawn directly from Swift’s real life and what's not". Helen Brown of The Independent wrote although the music might take time for listeners to absorb, Midnights is enriched by Swift's "assured lyrical control" and "feline vocal stealth". The Observer Kitty Empire described Midnights as "an album of fascinating small-hours contemplation".

Some critics were more reserved in their praise, taking issue with the production as somewhat redundant in places. Jon Caramanica of The New York Times and Paul Attard of Slant Magazine felt that Swift played it safe, and Ann Powers of NPR felt that the experiments result in a "half-finished quality" sometimes. For Pitchfork's Quinn Moreland and The Line of Best Fit's Paul Bridgewater, Midnights is Swift's most cohesive work thematically, but an underwhelming record sonically. Entertainment Weekly Marc Hirsh felt the tracks are not Swift's "stickiest", but still manage to effectively depict moods and emotions as desired. The Daily Telegraph's Neil McCormick appreciated Midnights as an intimate album, but said it suggests Swift's uncertainty "to press deeper into intimate songcraft or restart a commercial juggernaut". Carl Wilson of Slate liked the album's concept, sound and vocals, but identified some weak lyrics.

Year-end lists

Commercial performance 
Midnights is Swift's most commercially successful album to-date. It broke a string of sales, streaming, digital, vinyl and official chart records globally. Billboard declared it a blockbuster. According to Universal Music Group, Midnights moved three million global album-equivalent units in its first week, and over six million in two months. 

It achieved all-time records on Spotify, such as the most streamed album in a single day with 186 million streams in its opening day, surpassing the previous record of 155 million streams by Drake's Certified Lover Boy (2021); the most-streamed artist in a single day, with 228 million streams across Swift's discography—the first artist to cross the 200-million mark; the fastest album to amass 700 million streams (within a week); and various feats on other streaming platforms as well. Swift became 2022's second most streamed artist on Spotify, behind Bad Bunny. 

All of the album's tracks entered the Billboard Global 200; nine and eight of those charted within the top 10 of the Global 200 and Global Excl. US charts, respectively, setting records for the most simultaneous top-10 entries on both and making Swift the first artist to occupy the entire top five of the Global 200. The International Federation of the Phonographic Industry (IFPI) ranked Swift as 2022's Global Recording Artist of the Year—making her the first act to win the accolade three times (after 2014 and 2019); Midnights ranked second on the list of 2022's most consumed albums.

Americas 
In the US, Midnights sold over 800,000 pure copies in its first day, marking the best-selling album of 2022 and the biggest sales week for an album since Swift's own Reputation (2017). It surpassed 1.2 million units in first three days, becoming Swift's fifth album to open with one million sales —a record unique to her, and reached 1.4 million units by the fifth day, as well as 1.05 million pure sales, marking the largest opening week of the last seven years and Swift's career-best.

Midnights topped the Billboard 200 for five weeks, and spent thirteen consecutive weeks atop the Top Album Sales chart—the highest since Titanic: Music from the Motion Picture (1997). It opened with 1,578,000 units, of which 1.14 million were pure sales, including 575,000 vinyl LPs and 395,000 CDs. It became the year's best-selling vinyl LP and CD. Midnights garnered 549.26 million streams in its first week—the third-largest of all time. Overtaking Oops!... I Did It Again (2000) by Britney Spears, it marked the second-largest first week for an album by a female artist in the US, after Adele's 25 (2015). Swift tied Barbra Streisand for the most number-one albums among women (11), and most consecutive number-one debuts, surpassing Eminem and Kanye West. Midnights earned over 200,000 units in each of its first four weeks, and finished 2022 with 3.294 million total units. It subsequently became the first 21st-century album to sell over a million vinyl LPs in the US.

All of the album's 20 tracks debuted in the top 45 of the US Billboard Hot 100, giving Swift a total of 188 Hot 100 entries; the 13 standard tracks arrived in the top 15, led by "Anti-Hero", Swift's ninth US number-one song. Swift became the first act to control the entire top 10 of the Hot 100 concurrently; the woman with the most top-10 entries (40), surpassing Madonna (38); the first act to debut atop the Billboard 200 and Hot 100 simultaneously four times; and the first act to occupy the entire top 10 of the Hot 100, Streaming Songs, and Digital Songs charts together. Midnights is the first album in history with ten top-10 songs, surpassing Certified Lover Boy (9). Billboard noted its streams were strong enough to monopolize the top 10 without airplay or digital sales. Swift ranked as 2022's Billboard Year-End top female artist.

In Brazil, Midnights marked the biggest first-week Spotify streams ever for an album in the country. On the Canadian Albums Chart, Midnights opened with the biggest first-week of the year and scored Swift's 11th number-one album. All 20 tracks debuted within the first 35 spots of the Canadian Hot 100, with the top 10 spots entirely occupied by the album, led by "Anti-Hero".

Asia-Pacific 
In China, Midnights sold over 200,000 digital albums in its first day on QQ Music, opened with the year's best units for an international artist, and became 2022's best-selling album by a western artist. Three, four and eleven Midnights tracks debuted on the Indonesia Songs, Hong Kong Songs, and Malaysia Songs charts, led by "Anti-Hero" at numbers one, six and one, respectively. All of the album's standard tracks charted on the Vietnam Hot 100, and within the top-15 of Singapore Top 30 Chart. In the Philippines, it garnered the biggest first-week Spotify streams ever for an album in the country, and occupied the top 13 spots of the Philippines Songs chart, with "Anti-Hero" at number one. On India's IMI International Top 20 Singles chart, Midnights debuted seven tracks, led by "Anti-Hero" at number four.

The album became a record tenth consecutive number-one album for Swift in Australia, with the biggest opening week since Reputation. It set the Australian Recording Industry Association (ARIA) records for the biggest streaming and vinyl sales weeks for an album. All of its standard tracks entered the ARIA Singles Chart, occupying the entire top 14 region, except the seventh spot. With the debut of "Anti-Hero" atop the singles chart, Swift earned a record third Australian "Chart Double" of her career, extending the feat for five consecutive weeks. It was the best-selling album of 2022 in Australia, and has since spent twelve weeks atop the country's album chart, becoming her longest running number-one album. Midnights was Swift's 11th consecutive number-one album on the New Zealand Albums Chart. Four of its tracks debuted within the top-five of the New Zealand Top 40 Singles chart.

Europe 
Midnights opened with Swift's best first-week units in France, Germany, Italy, Poland, and the UK. In the latter, Midnights sold over 140,000 units in its first three days, surpassing the opening-week tally of Harry Styles' Harry's House (113,000 units) to become the fastest-selling album of 2022. Ultimately, the album debuted atop the UK Albums Chart, beating The Car by Arctic Monkeys to the top spot with 204,000 units—Swift's highest first-week tally. She broke Madonna's record for the shortest time for a female act to accumulate nine UK number-one albums, and became the first woman since Miley Cyrus in 2013 to simultaneously debut atop both the albums and singles chart, following the number-one debut of "Anti-Hero" as well. It also sold 80,000 vinyl copies in 2022, the highest annual figure for an album in the 21st century, propelling the UK's total vinyl sales past CD sales for the first time since 1987. Midnights spent five weeks atop the albums chart—her longest running number-one album in the UK.

The album marked Swift's eighth number-one album on the Irish Albums Chart and the biggest first week since Ed Sheeran's ÷ (2017), and spent seven weeks atop the chart. It scored her first number-one album on Germany's Top 100 Albums chart with the largest streaming week for an album by an international artist in the country in 2022 (20 million), and marked the year's biggest overall opening week for an international artist there. Furthermore, Midnights marked the biggest debut-week Spotify streams for an English-language artist in Spain; seven and eight of its tracks from debuted on Norway's Topp 40 Singles and Billboard Luxembourg Songs charts, respectively; Swift's fourth number-one debut on Portugal's Top 50 Albums chart; spent five non-consecutive weeks at number one in Sweden; the third best-selling album of 2022 in Austria, the Netherlands, and the UK.

Accolades 

Swift achieved over 20 Guinness World Record entries with the release of Midnights. She won all of her three nominations at the 48th People's Choice Awards, including the Female Artist of 2022.

Impact 
Swift's unanticipated announcement of the album at the Video Music Awards was a "headline-grabbing" moment, according to Billboard. Bruce Gillmer, the show's producer, stated that Midnights gave a "massive lift" to the viewership ratings. The album's cover artwork became an internet trend, mimicked and parodied by social media users, including official accounts of brands, organizations and celebrities. Apple Fitness+ released three exercise programs designed around Swift's music, featuring tracks from Midnights, curated for yoga, treadmill and HIIT workouts. Spotify's servers crashed for several minutes when the album was released.

Critical commentary described the pan-format success of Midnights in the streaming era as unprecedented. Various publications dubbed Swift as the paramount pop star of the 21st century, wielding a commercial and cultural dominance surpassing those of her contemporaries. Billboard noted how the album's success is "evenly" distributed across streaming, album sales and track sales, unlike other albums of 2022. Financial Times pondered whether Swift is "the last pop superstar", underscoring the 1.5 million first-week units—a figure unseen since the "1990s boy bands" era, which was regarded as the peak for the US music business. Music publisher Matt Pincus called Swift "basically an intellectual property franchise now. Like a DC movie". Fortune compared her to the Marvel Cinematic Universe. I-D dubbed Swift the "last remaining real popstar", capable of "shifting more albums and filling more stadiums than her contemporaries [...] unseen since the industry's golden era". Noting a 2021 article from The New York Times that asked "if Adele couldn't sell more than a million albums in a single week, could any artist?" after her album 30 missed the mark, Rolling Stone responded that Swift "has once again moved the goalposts regarding what the music industry can see as possible from a major pop star".

Many journalists acknowledged Swift's longevity. Slate underscored how Swift's career has lasted longer than that of the Beatles, and broke the band's once-deemed "unbeatable" records. Business journalist Greg Jericho, in The Guardian, lauded her ability to remain culturally relevant and successful 18 years into her music career, writing that the Rolling Stones, Bob Dylan, David Bowie and Bruce Springsteen were past their prime at that stage. Bree Player of Marie Claire wrote, "The word 'icon' is thrown around far too liberally these days, but Miss Swift is a living legend." When Jimmy Fallon listed Swift the album's achievements at The Tonight Show, Swift expressed her gratitude for the success but underscored the ageism regarding female singers: "It's like, you know, I'm 32. So, we're considered geriatric popstars [...] They start trying to put us out to pasture at age 25, I'm just happy to be here!"

The Washington Post proclaimed that Swift dominated 2022. According to CNET, 2022 is the most prominent year of Swift's career, led by the "mainstream cultural success" of Midnights. Bloomberg News reported that the album generated $230 million in sales for Universal Music Group in 2022, accounting for 3% of their annual revenue—the highest from any artist. As a result, Swift was the highest-paid woman in entertainment in 2022, earning US$92 million.

Track listing 
All songs written and produced by Taylor Swift and Jack Antonoff, except for where noted.

Notes
  signifies an additional producer
  signifies a co-producer
 "Question...?" interpolates Swift's 2014 song "Out of the Woods" written by herself and Antonoff.

Personnel 
Musicians

 Taylor Swift – vocals
 Jack Antonoff – percussion, programming, synthesizer (all tracks); background vocals (1, 3–5, 7, 9, 10, 13), drums (1, 3, 4, 6, 11–13), Mellotron (1, 3–5, 7), Wurlitzer organ (1, 3, 8), bass (2–5, 9, 15, 18, 20), electric guitar (2, 4, 5, 10, 12, 13, 15, 17, 18, 20), piano (2, 12, 15, 16, 20), acoustic guitar (3, 4, 5, 9, 15), crowd noises (7), slide guitar (15)
 Aaron Dessner – percussion (14, 17), keyboards (14, 17), synth bass (14), piano (14, 17), electric guitar (14, 19), synthesizer (17, 19), acoustic guitar (17), bass guitar (19), harmonica (19)
 Sam Dew – background vocals (1, 18)
 Zoë Kravitz – background vocals (1, 18)
 Jahaan Sweet – synth pads (1, 11); bass, flute, synthesizer (1); keyboards (11),
 Sounwave – programming (1, 11)
 Dominic Rivinius – snare drum (1), drums (7-8)
 Evan Smith – saxophone (2, 12, 13); clarinet, flute, organ (2, 12); synthesizer (4, 5, 7–9, 13, 16), percussion (16)
 Bobby Hawk – violin (3, 4, 13)
 Dylan O'Brien – drums (4), crowd noises (7)
 Lana Del Rey – vocals (4)
 Rachel Antonoff – crowd noises (7)
 Austin Swift – crowd noises (7)
 Sean Hutchinson – drums (5, 7), percussion (5)
 Mikey Freedom Hart – keyboards (9); programming (12-13), synthesizer (12-13, 16), theremin (16), organ (16)
 Keanu Beats – synthesizer (11)
 Michael Riddleberger – drums (13)
 Zem Audu – saxophone (12-13)
 Kyle Resnick – trumpet (14)
 Yuki Numata Resnick – violin
 Benjamin Lanz – drums, trombone (17)
 James Krivchenia – drums (17)
 Bryce Dessner – electric guitar (19)
 Bryan Devendorf – drums (19)
 James McAlister – drums (19), synthesizer (19)
 Thomas Bartlett – keyboards (19), synthesizer (19)

Technical

 Jack Antonoff – engineering
 Laura Sisk – engineering
 Şerban Ghenea – mixing
 Bryce Bordone – mixing assistance
 Randy Merrill – mastering
 Jahaan Sweet – engineering (1, 11)
 Ken Lewis – engineering (1, 7, 8)
 Evan Smith – engineering (2, 4, 5, 7–9, 12, 13)
 Jon Gautier – engineering (3, 13)
 Dave Gross – engineering (4)
 Sean Hutchinson – engineering (5, 7)
 David Hart – engineering (9, 13)
 Sounwave – engineering (11)
 Keanu Beats – engineering (11)
 Michael Riddleberger – engineering (13)
 Zem Audu – engineering (13)
 John Rooney – engineering assistance
 Jon Sher – engineering assistance
 Megan Searl – engineering assistance
 Jonathan Garcia – engineering assistance (1, 7, 8)
 Mark Aguilar – engineering assistance (1, 11)
 Jacob Spitzer – engineering assistance (4)
 Laurene Marquez – additional engineer
 James McAlister – drums programming (14, 17, 19)
 Jonathan Low – mixer, engineering (17, 19)
 Bella Blasko – engineering (14, 17, 19)
 Justin Vernon – additional engineer (19)
  Thomas Bartlett – additional engineer (19)

Charts

Weekly charts

Year-end charts

Certifications

Release history

See also 

 List of Billboard 200 number-one albums of 2022
 List of number-one albums from the 2020s (Denmark)
 List of number-one albums from the 2020s (New Zealand)
 List of number-one albums of the 2020s (Czech Republic)
 List of number-one albums of 2022 (Australia)
 List of number-one albums of 2023 (Australia)
 List of number-one albums of 2022 (Belgium)
 List of number-one albums of 2022 (Canada)
 List of number-one albums of 2022 (Ireland)
 List of number-one albums of 2023 (Ireland)
 List of number-one albums of 2022 (Portugal)
 List of number-one albums of 2022 (Spain)
 List of number-one hits of 2022 (Austria)
 List of number-one hits of 2022 (Denmark)
 List of number-one hits of 2022 (France)
 List of number-one hits of 2022 (Germany)
 List of number-one hits of 2022 (Switzerland)
 List of number-one singles and albums in Sweden of 2022
 List of Official Albums Streaming Chart number ones of 2022
 List of UK Albums Chart number ones of the 2020s
 List of UK top-ten albums in 2022
 Milestones and achievements for albums on Spotify

Footnotes

References

External links 

2022 albums
Albums produced by Taylor Swift
Albums produced by Jack Antonoff
Albums produced by Aaron Dessner
Bedroom pop albums
Chill-out music albums
Concept albums
Dream pop albums by American artists
Electronica albums by American artists
Republic Records albums
Synth-pop albums by American artists
Taylor Swift albums